Disperis nitida is a species of plants (in the family Orchidaceae) endemic to Cameroon which is found in two locations - Manengouba and in the mountainous region of Bamenda. In decline due to deforestation of its unprotected habitat, it is evaluated as a species in critical danger of extinction.

References

Bibliography
 Jean-Michel Onana and Martin Cheek, "Disperis nitida Summerh.", in Red Data Book of the Flowering Plants of Cameroon: IUCN Global Assessments, Royal Botanic Gardens, Kew, 2011,

External links
 
 
 
 
 
 
 

Orchideae
Endemic flora of Cameroon